Indian Antiguans and Indian Barbudans are Antiguans and Barbudans of entirely or predominantly Indian descent.

According to the 2011 Census, Indian Antiguans and Barbudans make up 1.11% of the population.

The majority of Indian Antiguans and Barbudans live in Saint John Parish, Antigua and Barbuda, while other parishes have Indian minorities of less than 100 people.

Statistics

References 

Antigua and Barbuda people of Indian descent
Demographics of Antigua and Barbuda